Broșteni is a town in Suceava County, in the historical region of Western Moldavia, northeastern Romania. Broșteni is the fourteenth largest urban settlement in the county, with a population of 5,388 inhabitants, according to the 2011 census. It was declared a town in 2004, along with seven other localities in Suceava County. The town administers the former villages of Hăleasa, Lungeni, and Neagra (which became neighborhoods in 2004), and Cotârgași, Dârmoxa, Frasin, Holda, Holdița, and Pietroasa (with the status of associated villages).

History 

Broșteni is a former mining community located on the banks of the river Bistrița, between Bistrița Mountains and Stânișoara Mountains. It administers a total area of  – the largest area being administered by a single locality in Suceava County. The national road between Vatra Dornei and Piatra Neamț is the main communication way for Broșteni, which is not connected to the national railway system.

Natives 

 Mihai Băcescu

Gallery

References

External links 

  Broșteni Town Hall official site
  The Local Police Station of Broșteni
  A blog about Broșteni
  Broșteni, orașul cu de-a sila – Newspaper article about Broșteni
  Suceava County site – Broșteni web page

Towns in Romania
Populated places in Suceava County
Localities in Western Moldavia
Mining communities in Romania